The following is a list of public housing estates in Wong Tai Sin, Kowloon, Hong Kong including Home Ownership Scheme (HOS), Private Sector Participation Scheme (PSPS), Sandwich Class Housing Scheme (SCHS), Flat-for-Sale Scheme (FFSS), and Tenants Purchase Scheme (TPS) estates.

History 
Lok Fu, Wong Tai Sin, Wang Tau Hom, and Tung Tau were home to a large number of public housing blocks built in the 1950s and 1960s to provide accommodation to Hong Kong's burgeoning population of refugee migrants. This type of housing, built in haste with limited resources, was rudimentary. The flats were no more than single rooms and families on each floor shared toilet and bathing facilities. In the 1980s, there was a push to redevelop the first generation of estates so that each family was housed in a self-contained flat. By the late 1980s, much of the area had been rebuilt.

Overview

Chuk Yuen Estate

Chuk Yuen Estate is a public housing estate in Wong Tai Sin and underneath Lion Rock. It is divided into Chuk Yuen (North) Estate and Chuk Yuen (South) Estate. The two estates has 8 blocks respectively, and all the blocks were built in the 1980s. In 1999, some of the flats were sold to tenants through Tenants Purchase Scheme Phase 2.

Kai Tak Garden 

Kai Tak Garden is a Flat-for-Sale Scheme court in Wong Tai Sin, formerly the site of Kai Tak Estate. It has 5 blocks developed by the Hong Kong Housing Society and built in 1998 (Block 1 to 3) and 2003 (Block 4 and 5) respectively.

Mei Tung Estate 

Mei Tung Estate is a public housing estate at the south of Wong Tai Sin. It consists of 2 Old Slab-typed blocks, each building is 8-storey, providing over 600 flats. Although the estate is near Kowloon City, it belongs to Wong Tai Sin District rather than Kowloon City District because it is located at the north of Tung Tau Tsuen Road, the boundary between two districts. A third block opened in 2010, and a fourth opened in 2014.

Background 
In 1971, the British Hong Kong Government cleared Tung Wo Village and Chiu Ping New Village in Tung Tau Squatter Area. In 1974, one block of the estate, "Block 6", was constructed. The government planned to demolish nearby Sai Tau Village in Kowloon City to construct remaining blocks, but the plan was strongly opposed by the village residents. As a result, the plan was left aside. (Sai Tau Village was finally demolished in 1984 to build the current Carpenter Road Park.) Since no other blocks were built, "Block 6" was renamed as "Mei Tung House" in 1979. In 1981, the government decided to construct one more block on the left side of Mei Tung House. In 1983, the block, "Mei Po House", was completed.

Houses

Tin Ma Court 

Tin Ma Court is a Home Ownership Scheme court in Wong Tai Sin, near Lung Cheung Road and Chuk Yuen Road. It has 5 blocks built in 1986.

Tin Ma Court is in Primary One Admission (POA) School Net 43. Within the school net are multiple aided schools (operated independently but funded with government money) and Wong Tai Sin Government Primary School.

Tin Wang Court 

Tin Wang Court is a Home Ownership Scheme court in Wong Tai Sin, near Tin Ma Court. It has 3 blocks built in 1992.

Tsui Chuk Garden 

Tsui Chuk Garden is a Home Ownership Scheme and Private Sector Participation Scheme estate in Wong Tai Sin, Kowloon, Hong Kong, adjacent to Lion Rock. It consists of 14 residential buildings built in 1989 (Phase 1 and 2, Block 1 to 12) and 1991 (Phase 3, Block 13 and 14) respectively. There is a bus terminus in the estate, which has a KMB bus route to MTR Wong Tai Sin station.

Tung Tau Estate 

Tung Tau Estate is a public housing estate and Tenants Purchase Scheme estate at the south of Wong Tai Sin. It is divided into Tung Tau (I) Estate and Tung Tau (II) Estate. Tung Tau (I) Estate has only one resettlement block, Block 22, built in 1965. Tung Tau (II) Estate has other 20 blocks built after its redevelopment in the 1980s and 1990s.

Tung Wui Estate 

Tung Wui Estate, also known as Tung Tau Estate Phase 9, consists of two residential blocks completed in 2012 providing a total of 1,333 residential units with sizes ranging from 14 to 39 square metres .

Houses

Lower Wong Tai Sin Estate 

Lower Wong Tai Sin Estate is a public housing estate and Tenants Purchase Scheme estate in Wong Tai Sin, along the south of Lung Cheung Road, near Wong Tai Sin Temple and MTR Wong Tai Sin station. It is divided into Lower Wong Tai Sin (I) Estate and Lower Wong Tai Sin (II) Estate. The estate now consists of totally 24 blocks built between the 1980s and 1990s.

Upper Wong Tai Sin Estate 

Upper Wong Tai Sin Estate is a public housing estates in Wong Tai Sin, along the north of Lung Cheung Road, near Wong Tai Sin Temple and MTR Wong Tai Sin station. It consists of 8 blocks built in 2000 and 2009 respectively, and it is now under redevelopment.

See also
 List of public housing estates in Hong Kong

References 

Wong Tai Sin
Wong Tai Sin District
Home Ownership Scheme
 
Flat-for-Sale Scheme